The 1889 South Dakota State Jackrabbits football team was an American football team that represented South Dakota State University as an independent during the 1889 college football season. In their first season of existence, they played in one game, a 6–6 tie against South Dakota.

Schedule

References

South Dakota State
South Dakota State Jackrabbits football seasons
College football undefeated seasons
College football winless seasons